Ayutla de los Libres  (Mixtec: Tatioo) is one of the 81 municipalities of Guerrero, in south-western Mexico. The municipal seat lies at Ayutla de los Libres. The municipality covers an area of 735.4 km².

As of 2010, the municipality had a total population of 60,690, up from 55,954 as of 2005.

Name
The name "Ayutla" comes from Nahuatl Ayotlan meaning "near the (place of abundance of) tortoises/turtles".  The sobriquet "de los Libres" ("of the Free") was added after 1854, because the town was the place where the Ayutla Revolution started on March 1, 1854, and where the Ayutla Plan was announced.

Towns
Acalmani (Ayutla de los Libres), Guerrero
Ayutla de los Libres
Colotepec

References

Municipalities of Guerrero